Sang Xu (born 29 September 1986 in Harbin, China), or Stephanie Sang, is a Chinese-Australian table tennis player and Olympian.

She competed at the 2008 Summer Olympics, reaching the second round of the singles competition. She also competed in the team competition.

She currently resides in Melbourne, Victoria.

She has qualified to represent Australia at the 2020 Summer Olympics.

References

External links
 
 
 
 
 
 
 

1986 births
Living people
Australian female table tennis players
Chinese emigrants to Australia
Olympic table tennis players of Australia
Table tennis players at the 2008 Summer Olympics
Commonwealth Games medallists in table tennis
Commonwealth Games silver medallists for Australia
Table tennis players at the 2006 Commonwealth Games
Sportswomen from Victoria (Australia)
Sportspeople from Melbourne
Australian sportspeople of Chinese descent
Naturalised table tennis players
Table tennis players from Harbin
Medallists at the 2006 Commonwealth Games